Matías Damián Palacios (born 10 May 2002) is an Argentine professional footballer who plays for UAE Pro League side Al Ain as a central midfielder.

Club career

San Lorenzo
Palacios began his career with San Lorenzo. He made his professional football debut on 21 September 2018, featuring for the final twenty-nine minutes of a 3–2 victory over Patronato at the Estadio Pedro Bidegain. Aged 16, it meant Palacios became the club's youngest ever player in Primera División history. He made five further appearances for the club, which included his one and only start on 10 January 2021 against Banfield.

Basel
On 15 February 2021, Palacios signed with Swiss Super League club Basel; penning a contract until 2025. He joined Basel's first team for their 2020–21 season under head coach Ciriaco Sforza. Palacios played his domestic league debut for his new club in the away game in the Kybunpark on 27 February as Basel were defeated 1–3 by St. Gallen. He scored his first goal for the club on 15 August 2021 in the Swiss Cup away game as Basel won 7–0 against amateur club FC Schönenwerd-Niedergösgen. He scored his first league goal for the club in the away game in the Swissporarena on 28 November as Basel won 3–1 against Luzern.

At the beginning of the next season Palacios left the club because he was only been used as a substitute. During his time with them, Palacios played a total of 62 games for Basel scoring a total of four goals. 31 of these games were in the Swiss Super League, three in the Swiss Cup, 12 in the Europa Conference League and 16 were friendly games. He scored one goal in the domestic league, two in the cup and the other was scored during the test games.

Al Ain
Palacios moved on to play for Al Ain in the United Arab Emirates.

International career
Palacios represented Argentina at U15, U17 and U20 level. For the U15s, Palacios won the 2017 South American Championship prior to winning the 2016 COTIF Tournament with the U20s. Pablo Aimar selected Palacios for the 2019 South American U-17 Championship on 3 March. Diego Placente called him up for the U17s' trip to Russia for the 2019 Granatkin Memorial. He scored in game one against Armenia, prior to netting versus Turkey in the semi-finals on the way to Argentina winning the competition. He was also chosen as the tournament's best midfielder. In October 2019, Palacios was picked for the 2019 FIFA U-17 World Cup in Brazil.

Personal life
His brother, Julián, is a fellow footballer; he also started off in San Lorenzo's youth academy.

Career statistics
.

Honours
Argentina U15
South American U-15 Championship: 2017

Argentina U17
South American U-17 Championship: 2019
Granatkin Memorial: 2019

Argentina U20
L'Alcúdia International Football Tournament: 2018

References

2002 births
Living people
People from General Pico
Argentine footballers
Argentina youth international footballers
Argentina under-20 international footballers
Association football midfielders
San Lorenzo de Almagro footballers
FC Basel players
Al Ain FC players
Argentine Primera División players
Swiss Promotion League players
Swiss Super League players
UAE Pro League players
Argentine expatriate footballers
Expatriate footballers in Switzerland
Argentine expatriate sportspeople in Switzerland
Expatriate footballers in the United Arab Emirates
Argentine expatriate sportspeople in the United Arab Emirates